Where the Earth Meets the Sky is a sculpture by Phillip K. Smith III, installed outside Oklahoma City's City Hall, in the U.S. state of Oklahoma.

Description and history
The base is circular and red, and the sculpture becomes increasingly modular and reflective with height. Smith has said of the artwork: 

The work is part of the City of Oklahoma City Public Art collection.

See also

 2012 in art

References

2012 establishments in Oklahoma
2012 sculptures
Bronze sculptures in Oklahoma
Concrete sculptures in the United States
Outdoor sculptures in Oklahoma City
Stainless steel sculptures in the United States
Steel sculptures in the United States